Lee Kyoung-hoon (born 24 August 1991), also known as K. H. Lee, is a South Korean professional golfer who plays on the PGA Tour. He won the 2021 and 2022 AT&T Byron Nelson.

Professional career
Lee turned professional in 2010 and joined the OneAsia Tour for 2011, earning his card through qualifying school. He finished 39th on the Order of Merit with his best finish being a tie for sixth. He joined the Japan Golf Tour in 2012 and recorded a runner-up finish in his second event of the year. He won the Nagashima Shigeo Invitational Sega Sammy Cup in July.

Lee claimed his first victory on the OneAsia Tour in September 2015, with a four stroke victory at the Kolon Korea Open. In October 2015, Lee won for the third time in his career, and second time on the Japan Golf Tour when he secured victory at the Honma TourWorld Cup at Trophia Golf.

Lee moved to the United States in 2016 to play the Web.com Tour, after finishing 8th in the Web.com Tour qualifying tournament. His best result was 4th at the WinCo Foods Portland Open. Two weeks later, he won the Kolon Korean Open, and in October he finished second at the Japan Open Golf Championship and Bridgestone Open.  He finished only 78th on the Web.com Tour, and played again in the qualifying tournament, where he tied for 14th place. He returned to the Web.com Tour in 2017 where his best finish was tied for third place in the Rex Hospital Open. In 2018, he finished fifth in the Web.com Tour regular season rankings to earn a promotion to the PGA Tour.

At the 2021 Waste Management Phoenix Open, Lee finished in a tie for second, one stroke behind winner, Brooks Koepka. Three months later, Lee earned his first PGA Tour win at the 2021 AT&T Byron Nelson, with a score of 25-under-par, beating runner-up Sam Burns by three strokes. A year later, Lee successfully defended his title at the AT&T Byron Nelson, shooting 26-under-par; beating Jordan Spieth by one shot.

In September 2022, Lee was selected for the International team in the 2022 Presidents Cup; he won two and lost one of the three matches he played.

Professional wins (6)

PGA Tour wins (2)

Japan Golf Tour wins (2)

OneAsia Tour wins (2)

1Co-sanctioned by the Korean Tour

Korean Tour wins (2)

1Co-sanctioned by the OneAsia Tour

Results in major championships
Results not in chronological order in 2020.

CUT = missed the halfway cut
NT = No tournament due to COVID-19 pandemic

Results in The Players Championship

CUT = missed the halfway cut
"T" indicates a tie for a place

Results in World Golf Championships

1Cancelled due to COVID-19 pandemic

"T" = Tied
NT = No tournament

Team appearances
Professional
Presidents Cup (representing the International team): 2022

See also
2018 Web.com Tour Finals graduates

References

External links

South Korean male golfers
Japan Golf Tour golfers
PGA Tour golfers
Asian Games medalists in golf
Asian Games gold medalists for South Korea
Golfers at the 2010 Asian Games
Medalists at the 2010 Asian Games
Korn Ferry Tour graduates
Korea National Sport University alumni
1991 births
Living people